HMS Ulster was a U-class destroyer of the Royal Navy of the United Kingdom that saw service during World War II. She was later converted into a Type 15 fast anti-submarine frigate, with the new pennant number F83. Ulster was the second vessel in Royal Navy history to have that name.

With funds gathered through a Naval Savings Campaign in 1942 known as Warship Week, the ship was adopted by the civil community of Ulster's County Down.

Specifications
The crew complement was 180 hands.

Armaments on the original construction and fitting consisted of: four 4.7-inch Mark IX guns, two 40mm Bofors, six QF 20mm Oerlikons and two quad-mounted 21-inch (533 mm) Mark IX torpedo tubes, as well as radar, sonar and depth charges.

Service history

Second World War service

In June 1943 construction was completed and Ulster went into duty in the English Channel. By the end of the year she would be on duty in the Mediterranean and Adriatic on anti-submarine missions, receiving damage from return fire. In April 1944 the destroyer would return to home waters and towards the end of the year would refit and have new radar and advanced warning systems installed.

At the beginning of 1945 Ulster was transferred to the British Pacific Fleet with the pendant "D", in keeping with the American system.

Pacific
Ulster, while serving with the British Pacific Fleet, had a near miss by a Japanese kamikaze and a 500 lb bomb during Operation Iceberg, the invasion of Okinawa. Ulster had her machinery spaces blown in and had to be towed to Leyte for temporary repairs, whence it sailed for Australia. Two sailors died and one was seriously injured in the attack. Nearly six months after the attack in October 1945 Ulster made it back to HM Dockyard, Chatham in England to undergo full repairs.

Post-War
After the Second World War Ulster was mostly used as a training vessel and for reserve purposes. Between 1953 and 1956 she underwent a full conversion to a Type 15 frigate at Chatham Dockyard. In 1957 she joined the 8th Frigate Squadron. Soon she was on duty in Iceland, Azores, and assigned to the North America and West Indies Station, based at the Royal Naval Dockyard in Bermuda, cruising to the West Indies and visiting the United States. In 1958 Ulster helped to restore power ashore in Nassau, Bahamas.

In 1964 she was again put into reserve in Plymouth. A year later in 1965, Ulster was re-commissioned in the 2nd Frigate Squadron, but then in 1967 was withdrawn from operational service.

In 1970 she was present at Portsmouth Navy Days; at the time she was the Navy's Navigational Training Ship. Finally in 1980 Ulster was bought by Thos. W. Ward and broken up.

References

Publications

Further reading

U and V-class destroyers of the Royal Navy
Ships built by Swan Hunter
Ships built on the River Tyne
1942 ships
World War II destroyers of the United Kingdom
Cold War destroyers of the United Kingdom
Type 15 frigates
Cold War frigates of the United Kingdom